Something's Gotta Give is a 2003 American romantic comedy-drama film written, produced and directed by Nancy Meyers. It stars Jack Nicholson and Diane Keaton as a successful 60-something and 50-something, who find love for each other in later life, despite being complete opposites. Keanu Reeves and Amanda Peet co-star, with Frances McDormand, Paul Michael Glaser, Jon Favreau, and KaDee Strickland playing key supporting roles.

The film received generally positive reviews from critics, and was a box office hit, grossing $266 million worldwide. For her performance Keaton received a nomination for the Academy Award for Best Actress, and won the Golden Globe Award for Best Actress – Motion Picture Comedy or Musical, while Nicholson received a nomination for the Golden Globe Award for Best Actor – Motion Picture Musical or Comedy.

Plot 
Harry Sanborn is a wealthy New York record company owner who only dates women under 30, including his latest girlfriend, Marin Klein. The two drive to her mother's Hamptons beach house, expecting to be alone. However, her mother, a playwright named Erica Barry, and Erica's sister Zoe, unexpectedly arrive.

After an awkward dinner, the night turns disastrous when—during foreplay with Marin—Harry has a heart attack and is rushed to a hospital. The attending doctor, Julian Mercer, tells Harry to stay nearby for a few days, so Harry reluctantly stays with Erica. Their personalities clash and create awkward living arrangements at first, but they soon find charming qualities in each other and begin to form a connection. Harry's relationship with her daughter and Erica's budding relationship with Julian become obstacles to their growing attraction. Marin tells her mother that she will break up with Harry, but he ends things first. Harry and Erica spend more time together and eventually have sex. Julian tells Harry he has improved enough to return to the city. He and Erica share an awkward goodbye, as despite their strong feelings, Harry is clearly hesitant to enter into a serious relationship.

Marin receives news that her father and Erica's ex-husband, Dave Klein, is getting remarried to a doctor who is only two years older than she. Though Erica is unaffected by the news, Marin is devastated and pressures her mother into accompanying her to a dinner. At dinner, Erica sees Harry at another table with another, much younger woman. An argument follows and Erica admits that she is in love with Harry, but he does not reciprocate, so she ends things between them and leaves. Harry suffers from what he believes is another heart attack, but in the emergency room he is told it was a panic attack.

Devastated, Erica returns home where she cries almost nonstop for several weeks, pouring her heartbreak into a new play about a woman who falls in love with her daughter's boyfriend, titling it "A Woman to Love," a phrase Harry had used to describe Erica. Harry hears about the play and rushes to the theater, where it is being rehearsed. Despite her denials, it is obvious that she has used the most personal details of their affair in the play. When he tells her he still cares about her, Erica rebuffs him. After learning his character dies in the play, he suffers another panic attack. At the hospital, he is told he needs to de-stress, and he relocates temporarily to the Bahamas.

Six months later, Erica's play is a huge success. Harry pays Marin a visit to apologize for any past disrespect, and discovers he never did and that she is now happily married and pregnant. Marin informs Harry that Erica is in Paris celebrating her birthday. Harry flies to Paris and surprises Erica at her favorite restaurant. He tells Erica that he has been reaching out to all the young women he had affairs with in an attempt to atone for his heartless behavior. Julian, whom Erica is now dating, appears.

Harry, Erica and Julian have dinner together, and part amicably outside the restaurant. While Harry gazes in heartache over the river Seine, Erica arrives. She tells him that Julian realized she still loves Harry and decided to step aside to let them be together. Harry tells her that at age 63, he's in love for the first time in his life, and they embrace.

A year later at a restaurant, Erica and Harry, now married, are out with Marin, her husband Danny and their new baby daughter, celebrating life as a loving family.

Cast 
 Jack Nicholson as Harry Sanborn, a 63-year-old, self-satisfied playboy and socialite who owns ten companies, including a magazine and the second-largest hip hop label in the world. He only dates women under the age of 30.
 Diane Keaton as Erica Barry, a 56-year-old successful, divorced Broadway playwright, partly living in an upscale Hamptons beach house. Having survived her divorce without huge bitterness, she lives a quiet life of professional fulfillment and romantic disappointment.
 Keanu Reeves as Julian Mercer, Harry's 36-year-old doctor. He is also a huge fan of Erica's, with whom he develops a relationship.
 Amanda Peet as Marin Klein, Erica's daughter, a 29-year-old auctioneer, working for Christie's.
 Frances McDormand as Zoe, Erica's sister. She is a lesbian feminist women's studies professor at Columbia University.
 Jon Favreau as Leo, Harry's personal assistant.
 Paul Michael Glaser as Dave Klein, Marin's father and Erica's ex-husband. He directs Erica's plays.
 Rachel Ticotin as Dr. Martinez, the ER doctor
 KaDee Strickland as Kristen, Dave's fiancée. She is an ear, nose and throat doctor who is two years older than Marin.
 Peter Spears as Danny Benjamin, Marin's husband near end of movie.

Soundtrack 
Something's Gotta Give was a co-production between Columbia Pictures and Warner Bros. Pictures. Both companies have released soundtracks for the movie. As of 2004, the soundtrack has sold 172,000 copies in United States.

The following soundtrack was released on December 9, 2003 by Warner Bros. Records.

Track listing – Warner Bros. 
 "Butterfly" – Crazy Town
 "Sing a Song" – Earth, Wind and Fire
 "Oooh Baby" – C+C Music Factory
 "Samba de mon cœur qui bat" – Coralie Clément
 "Fibre de Verre" – Paris Combo
 "Let's Get It On" – Marvin Gaye
 "O Beijo (The Kiss)" – Claudio Ragazzi
 "Here We Go" – Grits
 "Que reste-t-il de nos amours" – Charles Trenet
 "It's On Tonight" – Johnny Rourke
 "You Can Get It If You Really Want" – Jimmy Cliff
 "Have Dinner" – Badly Drawn Boy
 "Assedic" – Les Escrocs
 "I've Got a Crush on You" – Steve Tyrell
 "Graffito Disguise" – Mason Daring
 "I Only Have Eyes for You" – The Flamingos
 "La Vie en Rose" – Louis Armstrong
 "So Nice (Summer Samba)" – Astrud Gilberto
 "Boum!" – Charles Trenet
 "Je Cherche un Homme" – Eartha Kitt
 "Sunday Morning" – Maroon 5
 "Julian Calls" – Badly Drawn Boy
 "C'est si bon" – Eartha Kitt
 "Brazil" – Django Reinhardt
 "Exactly Like You" – Christopher Westlake and Bonnie Greenberg
 "Sweet Lorraine" – Stephane Grappelli, Ilsa Eckinger, Ike Isaacs and Diz Disley
 "I Only Have Eyes for You" – Michael Melvoin, John Guerin, Tony Dumas, and Mitch Holder
 "Learn How to Fall" – Paul Simon
 "La Vie en Rose" – Jack Nicholson

The following soundtrack was released on February 23, 2004 by Columbia Records.

Track listing – Columbia 
 "La Vie en Rose" – Louis Armstrong
 "I've Got a Crush on You" – Steve Tyrell
 "I Only Have Eyes for You" – The Flamingos
 "So Nice (Summer Samba)" – Astrud Gilberto
 "Remember Me" – Heitor Pereira
 "Samba de mon cœur qui bat" – Coralie Clément
 "Que reste-t-il de nos amours" – Charles Trenet
 "Assedic" – Les Escrocs
 "Je Cherche un Homme" – Eartha Kitt
 "C'est si bon" – Eartha Kitt
 "Brazil" – Django Reinhardt
 "Sweet Lorraine" – Stephane Grappelli, Ilsa Eckinger, Ike Isaacs and Diz Disley
 "Love Makes the World Go 'Round" – Deon Jackson
 "La Vie en Rose" – Jack Nicholson

The film was originally scored by Alan Silvestri and orchestrated by Tony Blondal, however creative differences led to Silvestri being replaced at the last minute by members of Remote Control Productions. As Silvestri's music was already recorded, some of it remains in the film.

Reception

Critical response 
On review aggregator website Rotten Tomatoes, the film holds an approval rating of 72% based on 171 reviews, with an average rating of 6.60/10. The site's critics consensus reads: "Though it occasionally stumbles into sitcom territory, Something's Gotta Give is mostly a smart, funny romantic comedy, with sharp performances from Jack Nicholson, Diane Keaton, and Keanu Reeves." On Metacritic the film has a weighted average score of 66 out of 100, based on 40 critics, indicating "generally favorable reviews". Audiences surveyed by CinemaScore gave the film a grade "A−" on scale of A to F.

Mick LaSalle, writing for the San Francisco Chronicle, felt the performances of the film's stars, Diane Keaton and Jack Nicholson, were among their best, and that Nicholson's acting, as his role covered a wider range of emotions, was the more complex. The reviewer praised the film for being a romantic comedy for adults:

Roger Ebert describes the film's dialog as "smart". Although noting that Keanu Reeves's role "seems like nothing more than a walking plot complication", he praises the performances of Keaton and Nicholson: "A movie like this depends crucially on its stars. To complain that Nicholson is playing "himself" – or that Keaton is also playing a character very much like her public persona – is missing the point. Part of the appeal depends on the movie's teasing confusion of reality and fiction."

Accolades 

The film is recognized by American Film Institute in these lists:
 2008: AFI's 10 Top 10:
 Nominated Romantic Comedy Film

Home media 
Something's Gotta Give was released on VHS on June 8, 2004 and DVD on March 30, 2004 by Columbia TriStar Home Entertainment and Warner Home Video.

References

External links 

 
 
 
 
 
 
 
 

2003 films
2003 romantic comedy-drama films
American romantic comedy-drama films
Columbia Pictures films
2000s English-language films
Films about writers
Films scored by Hans Zimmer
Films directed by Nancy Meyers
Films featuring a Best Musical or Comedy Actress Golden Globe winning performance
Films set in Long Island
Films set in New York City
Films set in Paris
Films shot in Los Angeles
Films shot in New York City
Films shot in Paris
Films with screenplays by Nancy Meyers
Midlife crisis films
Warner Bros. films
Films about mother–daughter relationships
2000s American films